The St. Louis crime family, also known as the Giordano crime family or St. Louis Mafia, is an Italian-American Mafia crime family based in St. Louis, Missouri, United States.

History

Early Italian gangs
The earliest records of the St. Louis Mafia date back to the mid-1890, with Italian Mafia gangs operating in the city. By the early 1910s, Dominick Giambrone was recognized as the local Mafia boss in St. Louis, until 1924, when he stepped down and fled the city. With the passage of Prohibition in 1920, control of St. Louis's illegal bootlegging operations became a major power struggle between the seven different ethnic gangs; the Green Ones, the Pillow Gang, the Russo Gang, the Egan's Rats, the Hogan Gang, the Shelton Gang and the Cuckoos all fighting to control illegal rackets in the St. Louis area. 

The Green Ones was a Sicilian gang, formed in 1915, by Vito Giannola, his brother John Giannola and Alphonse Palizzola before immigrating to America. After the three men arrived in America they went their separate ways: Vito Giannola to St. Louis, John Giannola to Chicago and Alphonse Palizzola to Springfield, Illinois. During the early 1920s, Vito Giannola reunited with his brother John Giannola and Alphonse Palizzola in St. Louis. The three men imposed a tax on all goods sold in the city's Italian community. In 1924, Vito Giannola became the most powerful Mafia boss in St. Louis forcing Dominick Giambrone to flee the city. Giannola attempted to take control of the bootlegging rackets in the area and fought with members of the Egan's Rats gang and Cuckoos Gang. On September 9, 1927 Alphonse Palizzola was shot and killed by a rival gang. Months later boss Vito Giannola was shot 37 times to death on December 28, 1927. The remaining members of the Green Ones gang including John Giannola went into hiding.

The Pillow gang was the earliest Italian gang in the city being active since 1910. The gang was led by Pasquale Santino until 1927, when he was murdered. Carmelo Fresina became the new leader, giving the gang the nickname "the Pillow gang" because Fresina carried a pillow with him to sit on after, he had been shot in the buttocks. Fresina formed an alliance with splinter group of the Green Ones called the Russo gang led by Tony Russo. The two gangs battled with the Green Ones until 1928, when the Russo gang lost to many members and blamed the Pillow gang for betraying them. In 1931, Fresina was murdered and members of the Pillow gang continued fighting with the Russo gang and the Green Ones.

The Pillow gang was taken over Thomas Buffa, who became boss of the St. Louis Mafia family. The rival gangs continued fighting until the end of Prohibition, when the various Mafia factions began functioning as one family. In 1943, Buffa fled the city and was murdered in 1947 in Lodi, California. After Buffa's murder leadership of the family went to Tony Lopiparo, Frank Coppola, and Ralph Caleca.

Giordano and the Detroit family
After Tony Lopiparo's death, Anthony Giordano became boss and declared independence from the Kansas City crime family. In the 1970s, Giordano, along with Detroit mobsters Anthony Joseph Zerilli and Michael Polizzi, attempted to gain control of the Frontier Hotel and Casino in Las Vegas. They failed and all three men were convicted of conspiracy. In 1975, Giordano was sent to prison, his nephew Vincenzo Giammanco became the acting boss until Giordano was released in December 1977. On August 29, 1980, Giordano died from cancer in his St. Louis home.

Current status
The St. Louis crime family has stayed under the radar of both local and federal authorities, who have been focused on organized crime that inflicts public violence. Anthony "Nino" Parrino served as boss of the St. Louis crime family from 1997 to his death on November 3, 2014. The last known underboss was Joseph Cammarata. According to Scott Burnstein's Gangster Report website, the family has been reduced to less than 10 members.

Historical leadership

Boss (official and acting)
1912-1923 — Dominick Giambrone — fled, later murdered in 1934
1923-1927 — Vito Giannola
1927-1937 — Frank Agrusa — born in Cinisi, Sicily, Italy
1937-1943 — Thomas Buffa 
1943-1950 — Pasquale Miceli
1950-1960 — Anthony "Tony Lap" Lopiparo — the son of a St. Louis mobster, he died in 1960.
1960-1980 — Anthony "Tony G." Giordano — as boss he declared independence from the Kansas City family. Imprisoned 1975-1977, died on August 29, 1980 from cancer
Acting 1975-1977 — Vincenzo "Jimmy" Giammanco — Giordano's nephew
1980-1982 — John "Johnny V." Vitale. — died on June 5, 1982
1982-1997 — Matthew "Mike" Trupiano, Jr. — Giordano's nephew from Detroit; died in 1997
1997–2014 — Anthony "Nino" Parrino died November 3, 2014.
2014–Present – Vincent "Vince" Giordano

Underboss
1912-1923 — Vito Giannola — became boss
1923-1927 — Alfonse Palazzolo — murdered
1927-1937 — Thomas Buffa — became boss
1937-1943 — Pasquale Miceli — became boss
1943-1950 — Vincent Chiapetta – demoted
1950-1980 — John "Johnny V." Vitale — semi-retired from 1960, later became boss
1980-2000s — Joseph "Uncle Joe" Cammarata — semi-retired, died in 2013
2000s–2014 – Vincent "Vince" Giordano – became boss

References

Sources

DeVico, Peter J. The Mafia Made Easy: The Anatomy and Culture of La Cosa Nostra. Tate Publishing, 2007. 
Dietche, Scott M. The Everything Mafia Book: True Life Accounts of Legendary Figures, Infamous Crime Families, and Chilling Events, Everything Books, 2009. 
Waugh, Daniel. Gangs of St. Louis: Men of Respect. Charleston: The History Press, 2010. 
Auble, John. A History of St. Louis Gangsters: A Chronology of Mob Activity on Both Sides of the River Ranging from the Egan Rats to the Last Mob Leader on Record. The National Criminal Research Society. 2002.  
Bureau of Narcotics. The United States Treasury Department. Giancana, Sam. Mafia: The Government's Secret File on Organized Crime. Skyhorse Publishing, 2007.

External links
American Gangland: Giordano Crime Family

Gangs in St. Louis
Italian-American crime families
Italian-American culture in Missouri